Aethes labonita is a species of moth of the family Tortricidae. It was described by Razowski & Wojtusiak in 2013. It is found in Sucumbíos Province, Ecuador.

The ground colour of the forewings is cream, but white in the costal and median parts of the wing. The strigulation (fine streaking) is grey and brown and the costa is brown up to the middle. The markings are brown. The hindwings are white cream strigulated and suffused with brownish grey in the terminal part.

Etymology
The species name refers to La Bonita, the type locality.

References

labonita
Moths described in 2013
Taxa named by Józef Razowski
Moths of South America